KELI or Keli may refer to:

KELI (FM), a radio station (98.7 FM) licensed to San Angelo, Texas, United States
KTBZ (AM), a radio station (1430 AM) in Tulsa, Oklahoma, United States that previously held the call sign
Kelli, Drama, a former village in Greece
Keli (film), a 1991 Indian Malayalam drama film directed by Bharathan
Scottish term for Sherbet (powder)